Dachine Rainer (born Sylvia Newman; January 13, 1921 – August 19, 2000) was an American-born English writer.

Selected works 
Outside Time (1948)
Giornale Di Venezia (Salzburg Studies in English Literature. Poetic Drama & Poetic Theory, 167), 1996 
The Uncomfortable Inn (1960)

References

Further reading

External links
 Dachine Rainer Papers at Yale's Beinecke Rare Book & Manuscript Library

1921 births
2000 deaths
20th-century American Jews
20th-century English poets
20th-century English women writers
20th-century pseudonymous writers
American emigrants to the United Kingdom
American people of Polish-Jewish descent
Anarchist writers
Burials at Highgate Cemetery
English anarchists
English Jews
English people of Polish-Jewish descent
English women poets
Jewish American writers
Jewish anarchists
Jewish women writers
Pseudonymous women writers